Eugenia oreophila can refer to:

 Eugenia oreophila Ridl., a synonym of Syzygium oreophilum
 Eugenia oreophila Rech., a synonym of Syzygium brevifolium
 Eugenia oreophila Diels, a synonym of Myrcianthes oreophila